"Freestyle" is a song written and recorded by American country music trio Lady Antebellum. It was written Dave Haywood, Charles Kelley, Hillary Scott and Shane McAnally, and co-produced by Nathan Chapman. The song served as the second single for the trio's sixth studio album, 747 and was released on October 20, 2014, and it features lead vocals from Kelley.

Background and composition
During the group's 2014 tour, Charles Kelley told Rolling Stone, "Songs like 'Freestyle'" was a departure for them but "it's been proven to us over the past couple of years — is that when we do take chances, the fans have responded really well."

Critical reception
Giving it a "C+", Bob Paxman of Country Weekly praised the song's "catchy" production, but felt that Lady Antebellum was "nearly unrecognizable" due to the rapid-fire lyric delivery. He also criticized the lyrics for having "buzzwords and imagery" that were "scattered".

Music video
The music video for "Freestyle" was released in October 2014 and comedian and dancer Nathan Barnatt appears in the video. Part of the video was filmed at the Gramercy Theatre in Manhattan.

Synopsis
Barnatt plays his alter ego "Keith Apicary", who is determined to meet Lady Antebellum in person. After falling short of meeting them, he comes up with a way to get past security by putting on a cowboy hat and a Lady Antebellum T-shirt. He eventually meets his goal when Charles (Kelley) invites him backstage where he meets the band.

Chart performance

Year-end charts

Release history

References

2014 singles
Lady A songs
Capitol Records Nashville singles
Songs written by Dave Haywood
Songs written by Charles Kelley
Songs written by Hillary Scott
Songs written by Shane McAnally
Song recordings produced by Nathan Chapman (record producer)
2014 songs